Amos Matteucci (20 March 1915 - 26 December 2008) was an Italian javelin thrower who competed at the 1952 Summer Olympics,

Achievements

References

External links
 

1915 births
2008 deaths
Athletes (track and field) at the 1952 Summer Olympics
Italian male javelin throwers
Olympic athletes of Italy